Miori is an Italian surname. Notable people with the surname include:
 Carlos Miori (1901–1985), Argentinian football player
 Eugenia Ramírez Miori (born 1974), Argentinian actress, singer and dancer
 Luciano Miori (1895–1975), Italian politician
 Luciano Miori (drawer) (1921–2006), Italian drawer
 Luciano Miori (latinist) (1921–2006), Italian latinist, Greek scholar and translator.
 Mirco Miori (born 1995), Italian football player

Italian-language surnames
Surnames of South Tyrolean origin
Surnames of Argentine origin